Watcharapong Mak-klang (Thai วัชรพงษ์ มากกลาง ), (born June 13, 1985) is a Thai footballer. He plays for Thailand Premier League clubside Sriracha.

Honours

Clubs
 Kor Royal Cup 2009 Winner with Chonburi

External links
Profile at Thaipremierleague.co.th

1985 births
Living people
Watcharapong Mak-klang
Watcharapong Mak-klang
Association football forwards
Watcharapong Mak-klang